CPX may refer to:

 Benjamín Rivera Noriega Airport (IATA code), Puerto Rico
 8-Cyclopentyl-1,3-dimethylxanthine, a drug
 Ciclopirox, a antifungal drug
 Clinical performance exam, formally objective structured clinical examination, a prerequisite to working in various health care fields
 Clinopyroxene, monoclinic pyroxene, an igneous and metamorphic mineral
 The Centre for Public Christianity (CPX) is a not-for-profit media company that offers a Christian perspective on contemporary life.
 Control Panel eXtension modules of Atari ST computers
 CPX Test; Cardiopulmonary Exercise Test, or Cardiac stress test